The seventh series of British reality television series The Apprentice (UK) was broadcast in the UK on BBC One, from 10 May to 17 July 2011; due to a qualifying match for the 2011–12 UEFA Champions League set to be aired live on 20 July, the final episode was given an earlier broadcast date to avoid clashing with this.

After six years of offering a six-figure job as a prize, both Alan Sugar and the production staff conducted a rethink on what the programme offered after the former threatened to quit. This led to the decision that Sugar now offered a £250,000 investment for the winning candidate to use towards starting their own business. The change in prize led to a complete revamp of the format concerning tasks, with the Interviews stage assigned as the final task, and extended to include a scrutiny of each candidate's business plans amongst the other questions made by interviewers. Alongside the standard twelve episodes, with the first two aired within a day of each other, two specials were aired alongside this series – "The Final Five" on 7 July; and a series exclusive, "How To Get Hired" on 15 July.

For the sixteen candidates who took part, the change in prize did not deter their participation, with Tom Pellereau becoming the overall winner and the first to win the new prize. Excluding the specials, the series averaged around 8.80 million viewers during its broadcast, and is the most watched series of The Apprentice to date.

Series overview 
Following the end of the sixth series, Alan Sugar began to question his involvement in the programme, due to the nature of what he offered to those participating and the overall format of The Apprentice. Meeting with both the broadcaster and the production company, Sugar threatened to quit unless changes were made. His demand led to the decision that a re-think of the programme was essentially required to keep the show fresh. In discussing how to alter the format, Sugar expressed a belief that there was too high an expectation amongst young entrepreneurs over becoming the next big name in business when setting up their own company, faulting a belief that such individuals suffered from a "fast buck mentality". He thus suggested that The Apprentice geared itself towards showing a scaled but realistic approach to starting up a company. This suggestion led to a complete overhaul of the format, assigning the design of tasks towards setting up, running and operating businesses as smoothly as possible, while offering new participants a life-changing opportunity – the winning candidate would now receive a £250,000 investment towards a new business they wished to start, with Sugar taking a 50% stake in the business in exchange for providing his guidance and support, along with supplying a team of experts to help develop the winning candidate's plan.

The change in format was finalised during the processing of applications for the seventh series, between April and July 2011, with Sugar accepting the changes to remain with the programme. For those applying for a place in the programme, the change in prize came as a surprise, as many still expected it to be the six-figure job, effectively leading those who became part of the final line-up having to come up with business plans before recording of the first episode was set to take place. One task retained during the revamp of the show's tasks structure was the Interviews stage, but this came with it being extended in how it operated – alongside interviewers questioning each candidate about their background, work experience and performance on tasks, candidates were informed that their business plans would also come under scrutiny in this stage – with the task itself being reallocated as the final task of the series. Following the last series, two of the interviewers – Bordan Tkachuk and Alan Watts – decided to leave the programme, leading to Sugar replacing them with Mike Soutar and Matthew Riley. With production completed and final editing almost finished, the sixteen candidates who secured a place on the series were revealed on 3 May 2011, a week before the series premiered, with the first task revealing that the men named their team Logic, while the women named their team Venture.

This series is notable for featuring a task in which the winning team was not given a prize – arranged by Sugar for those who worked hard to win a task, it was withdrawn when the winning team had failed to comprehend the basis of the task's goal – along with a candidate establishing records for the most wins, both consecutive and total. Of those who took part, Tom Pellereau would become the eventual winner, going on to make subsequent appearances on You're Fired as an audience member during later series, while also launching a range of manicure products with assistance from Lord Sugar. Amongst the products he would create would include a line of curved nail files – the S-file, the S-Buffer and the Emergency File, two curved nail clippers, the S-Clipper and S-Clipper mini and a curved foot exfoliator, and the S-Ped – all of which would be stocked by major retailers in the country. Susan Ma, who would lose out in the final, would later receive an investment offer from Sugar, that she would put towards creating her skincare company Tropic in 2012.

Candidates

Performance chart 

Key:
 The candidate won this series of The Apprentice.
 The candidate was the runner-up.
 The candidate won as project manager on his/her team, for this task.
 The candidate lost as project manager on his/her team, for this task.
 The candidate was on the winning team for this task.
 The candidate was on the losing team for this task.
 The candidate was brought to the final boardroom for this task.
 The candidate was fired in this task.
 The candidate lost as project manager for this task and was fired.

Episodes

Ratings 
Official episode viewing figures are from BARB.

Specials

References

External links 

 

2011 British television seasons
07